This article presents a list of the historical events and publications of Australian literature during 1894.

Books 

 Rolf Boldrewood – A Modern Buccaneer
 Guy Boothby – In Strange Company : A Story of Chili and the Southern Seas
 Carlton Dawe – Confessions of a Currency Girl
 Mary Gaunt – Dave's Sweetheart
 Nat Gould – Stuck Up
 E. W. Hornung
 The Boss of Taroomba
 The Unbidden Guest
 Fergus Hume – The Nameless City: a Rommany Romance
 George McIver – Neuroomia: A New Continent: A Manuscript Delivered from the Deep
 Ethel Turner – Seven Little Australians

Short stories 

 Louis Becke
 By Reef and Palm
 "A Dead Loss"
 Ernest Favenc
 Tales of the Austral Tropics
 "An Unquiet Spirit"
 Henry Lawson
 "Enter Mitchell"
 "Bush Cats"
 Louisa Lawson – "Manager and Muddler"
 Hume Nisbet – The Haunted Station and Other Stories

Poetry 

 Jennings Carmichael – "A Woman's Mood"
 Victor J. Daley – "A Vision of Youth"
 Edward Dyson – "The Rescue"
 George Essex Evans – "McCarthy's Brew: A Gulf Country Yarn"
 Charles Augustus Flower – "A Thousand Miles Away"
 Henry Lawson
 "Australian Bards and Bush Reviewers"
 "The Fire at Ross's Farm"
 "In the Days When the World Was Wide"
 Breaker Morant – "Beyond His Jurisdiction"
 John Shaw Neilson – "Before the Looking Glass"
 Will H. Ogilvie – "The Riding of the Rebel"
 A. B. Paterson
 "How Gilbert Died"
 "How the Favourite Beat Us"
 "Saltbush Bill"
 "The Travelling Post Office"
 "A Voice from the Town"

Births 

A list, ordered by date of birth (and, if the date is either unspecified or repeated, ordered alphabetically by surname) of births in 1894 of Australian literary figures, authors of written works or literature-related individuals follows, including year of death.

 7 January – Jean Devanny, novelist (died 1962)
 31 August – A. B. Facey, novelist (died 1982)
 22 October – Paul Grano, poet (died 1975)

Deaths 

A list, ordered by date of death (and, if the date is either unspecified or repeated, ordered alphabetically by surname) of deaths in 1894 of Australian literary figures, authors of written works or literature-related individuals follows, including year of birth.

 28 November – Alice Ashton Eastmure, poet (born 1833)

See also 
 1894 in poetry
 List of years in literature
 List of years in Australian literature
1894 in literature
1893 in Australian literature
1894 in Australia
1895 in Australian literature

References

Literature
Australian literature by year
19th-century Australian literature
1894 in literature